Shasha Damilola Alesh better known by his stage name Dice Ailes, is a Nigerian singer, songwriter and rapper. In July 2014, he signed a record deal with Chocolate City. He was nominated for Rookie of the Year at The Headies 2016. In 2016, TooXclusive ranked his breakthrough single "Miracle" third on its list of the "Top 10 Songs for the month of October". In 2017, tooXclusive named him as "one of the sixteen artists you need to know.

Early life and education
He schooled in Nigeria at lagooz college, Republic of Benin, and Ghana then relocated to Canada where he studied at York University and also started his musical career before relocating back to Nigeria after his record deal with Chocolate City in 2014.

Career
He started out as a church choir, he started out too with Hyce- age, coker, Millie and reihnard while in the label. He achieved recognition in 2016 for his CKay-produced single "Miracle" featuring Lil Kesh.

On 21 December 2016, Dice Ailes shared stage with likes of WSTRN, Krept and Konan, Migos alongside Lil Kesh at the "Beat FM Xmas concert" 2016 in Lagos.

In an interview with Tush Magazine, Dice Ailes describes his style of music as "Afro-pop RnB". In his words:
He also said in 2018 that he didn't sing the song "Otedola" to either get money from billionaire Femi Otedola or get close to his family. He said "Whatever you do , people will always have their reservations and opinions , but I didn’t do the song to get money from Otedola or to get close to his family. I was just having fun . Surprisingly , upon releasing the song , I got to meet Otedola and he gave me a lot of money. I am close to the family members and I call him on the telephone whenever I like. I didn't plan for all these as some people have said". In 2020 a fan once challenged Dice for not lending his voice to the rape issue that was happening in Nigeria. The singer replied that he was not a Nigerian, this led to a row on Twitter as his fans vowed to disown the singer.

Discography

Singles

Compilation singles

Compilation albums

Cover

Awards and nominations

See also
List of Nigerian musicians

References

External links
 Dice Ailes profile on Chocolate City

Living people
Nigerian male musicians
Nigerian male singer-songwriters
Nigerian singer-songwriters
Yoruba-language singers
Yoruba musicians
Nigerian male rappers
Nigerian hip hop singers
21st-century Nigerian musicians
Nigerian songwriters
1993 births
21st-century male musicians
York University alumni